MonoKote is commercially available lightweight plastic shrink wrap film available in various colors. It has a heat-activated adhesive on one side and is used to cover the surfaces of a model aircraft. The material is cut to size and applied to the airframe surfaces using a hobby iron and heat gun. Top Flite MonoKote covering film is produced by General Formulations of Sparta, MI.

The name MonoKote, a registered trademark of model aircraft manufacturer Top Flite, refers to the fact that it is a one-step covering material to coat the surface of the model.  The patent for Top Flite MonoKote is held by Sidney Axelrod

MonoKote is also a type of fireproofing material, which is either gypsum- or cement-based and is spray-applied. The name MONOKOTE is the subject of global trademark registrations owned by GCP Applied Technologies Inc., a Delaware Corporation formed from the Grace Construction Products and Packaging businesses that were spun off from W. R. Grace & Co. in February 2016 (e.g., US Registration No. 1,468,327; Canadian Registration No. 858389; and other international registrations).

See also
 Ultracote

References

External links
 Top Flite MonoKote

Radio-controlled aircraft